Fayette County Public Schools is a school district based in Lexington, Kentucky (U.S.).

The district serves all of Fayette County, which is coextensive with the city of Lexington.

Administration

Superintendent
 Demetrius Liggins (2021-)

Other administrators
 Lisa Deffendall, District Spokesperson 
 Tanya Dailey, Executive Assistant

Board of Education
The Fayette County Board of Education consists of members elected to four year terms from five districts, as well as the Superintendent. Districts 1, 3, and 5 hold elections in presidential election years, while Districts 2, and 4 hold elections in mid-term years.

The board holds two meetings each month, both open to the public. The first meeting of the month is an agenda planning meeting, while official action is taken at the second meeting. The second meeting of each month is televised locally on cable channel 197  and streamed on the district's Web site.

School Board members
 Daryl Love 
 Raymond Daniels 
 Stephanie Spires 
 Melissa Bacon 
 Doug Barnett

Schools

Secondary schools

High schools
The Steam Academy
Henry Clay High School 
 Bryan Station High School
 Paul Laurence Dunbar High School 
 Frederick Douglass High School 
 Lafayette High School  
 Tates Creek High School
 Eastside Technical Center
 Southside Technical Center
 Locust Trace AgriScience Center
 Opportunity Middle College

Middle schools
 E.J. Hayes Middle School
 Beaumont Middle School
 Bryan Station Middle School
 Jessie Clark Middle School
 Leestown Middle School
 Lexington Traditional Magnet School
 Morton Middle School  
 Southern Middle School
 Tates Creek Middle School  
 Winburn Middle School
 Crawford Middle School

Combined middle/high schools
 Carter G. Woodson Academy — An all-boys college preparatory program for grades 6–12, aimed mainly at minority students. The program was formerly housed at Crawford Middle School, but is now at Frederick Douglass High School.

4-8 schools
 School for the Creative and Performing Arts (SCAPA)

Primary schools
Athens Elementary School
Breckinridge Elementary School
Arlington Elementary School
Ashland Elementary School
Cardinal Valley Elementary School
Cassidy Elementary School
Clays Mill Elementary School
Coventry Oak Elementary School
Deep Springs Elementary School
Dixie Elementary School
J.R. Ewan Elementary School
Garden Springs Elementary School
Garrett Morgan Elementary School
Glendover Elementary School
Harrison Elementary School
James Lane Allen Elementary School 
Johnson Elementary School
Lansdowne Elementary School
Liberty Elementary School
Julius Marks Elementary School
Maxwell Elementary School
Meadowthorpe Elementary School
Millcreek Elementary School
Northern Elementary School
Rosa Parks Elementary School
Picadome Elementary School
Russell Cave Elementary School
Sandersville Elementary School
Southern Elementary School
Stonewall Elementary School
Tates Creek Elementary School
Mary Todd Elementary School
Veterans Park Elementary School
Booker T. Washington Elementary School
William Wells Brown Elementary School
Yates Elementary School
Squires Elementary School

Magnet programs
FCPS offers many magnet programs with varying entrance requirements.

Magnets without entrance criteria
 Dixie Elementary Individually Prescribed Education
 Maxwell Spanish Immersion

Magnets with entrance criteria
 Ashland Elementary Accelerated Cluster
 Bryan Station High School Information Technology (IT) Academy
 Liberal Arts Academy at Henry Clay High School
 Math, Science, and Technology Center at Paul Laurence Dunbar High
 Meadowthorpe Elementary Accelerated Cluster
 Pre-Engineering at Lafayette High
 SCAPA Bluegrass (Located on the same campus as Lafayette High)
 Winburn Middle Accelerated Cluster

Lottery magnets with entrance criteria
 Bryan Station Traditional Middle 
 Lexington Traditional Magnet School (LTMS)

References

External links
 

School districts in Kentucky
Education in Fayette County, Kentucky